Soňa Mihoková (born 11 November 1971 in Liptovský Mikuláš) is a Slovak biathlete. She finished 4th in the sprint at the 1998 Winter Olympics.

References
 IBU Profile

External links

1971 births
Living people
Slovak female biathletes
Olympic biathletes of Slovakia
Biathletes at the 1994 Winter Olympics
Biathletes at the 1998 Winter Olympics
Biathletes at the 2002 Winter Olympics
Biathletes at the 2006 Winter Olympics
Universiade medalists in biathlon
Universiade silver medalists for Slovakia
Competitors at the 1999 Winter Universiade
Sportspeople from Liptovský Mikuláš